Luke Patrick Graham (born June 1985) is a British Conservative Party politician who served as the Member of Parliament for Ochil and South Perthshire from 2017 to 2019. From September 2018, Graham served in the role of Parliamentary Private Secretary (PPS) to the Cabinet Office. He was later made PPS to the Ministry of Housing, Communities and Local Government. He held both positions concurrently until the end of the Second May Ministry.

Early life 
Graham was born in Eldene, Swindon, Wiltshire in June 1985 and was educated at the Dorcan Academy, the local comprehensive. He graduated from the University of Sheffield with a BA in Economics and Social Policy in 2006. Graham graduated with 2.1 Dual Honours, before serving as the Finance Officer of Sheffield University Union from 2006-07.

Prior to entering the Commons, he worked for Tesco plc for five and a half years whilst gaining his Chartered Institute for Management Accounting qualification. During his tenure, he worked in the UK, Thailand and China. After Tesco, Graham joined Tough Mudder, a British firm launched in the US. He later accepted a job as a senior manager at Marks and Spencer plc and returned to the UK.

Graham started his own accountancy business, Tech & The Beancounters, in 2016.

Political career 
Graham first entered Scottish politics in 2014, when he actively campaigned for Better Together, the unionist campaign during the 2014 Scottish independence referendum. Graham was subsequently selected to contest the constituency of Ochil and South Perthshire at the 2015 general election. Graham finished in third place.

Graham was the Director of Finance of Britain Stronger in Europe, the official Remain campaign in the 2016 EU Membership Referendum.

Graham was reselected to contest the Ochil and South Perthshire seat during the 2017 United Kingdom general election. He defeated the sitting Scottish National Party MP, Tasmina Ahmed-Sheikh. Graham successfully overturned Ahmed-Sheikh's 10,168 majority to win by 3,359.

In November 2018 he was the recipient of a £25,000 donation from Lord Sainsbury of Turville, which was donated to the Scottish Conservative Party for Graham's association.

He voted in favour of former Prime Minister Theresa May's deal to leave the European Union.

Graham backed Michael Gove during the Conservative leadership contest.

He was a member of the Public Accounts Committee from September 2017 until October 2018 and subsequently served as a member of the Finance Committee for the House of Commons.

Causes that Graham worked extensively on included renewable energy (particularly geothermal), domestic abuse, and farming.

In March 2019 a staff member working in Graham's constituency office was threatened by two men who allegedly said that "in an independent Scotland all of you will be hanging", banging on windows and shouting at the staffer. Police Scotland stated they would be making inquiries. Later that month, the police issued descriptions of individuals they would like to speak to relating to the incident.

Seeking re-election at the 2019 United Kingdom general election on 12 December 2019, Graham lost his seat to the Scottish National Party's John Nicolson, who was previously MP for East Dunbartonshire.

Although Graham lost his constituency, the Conservative Party won the general election. Following the election he was appointed to head a "Union unit" in 10 Downing Street, which gave him responsibility for supporting unionism and opposing Scottish independence. Graham was replaced in February 2021 by Oliver Lewis.

References

External links

1985 births
Living people
Alumni of the University of Sheffield
British accountants
People from Swindon
People from Wiltshire
Scottish Conservative Party MPs
Tesco people
UK MPs 2017–2019